Catrine and Sorn was one of 10 electoral wards of Cumnock and Doon Valley District Council. Created in 1974, the ward elected one councillor using the first-past-the-post voting electoral system.

The ward produced strong results for Labour with the party holding the seat at two of the three elections. It was also the last seat in Cumnock and Doon Valley to elect a Conservative councillor when the party won the seat in 1977.

In 1984, the ward was abolished and the area covered by it was placed in the new Catrine, Sorn and North Auchinleck ward.

Boundaries
The Catrine and Sorn ward was created in 1974 by the Formation Electoral Arrangements from the previous Sorn electoral division of Ayr County Council. The ward centered around the villages of Catrine and Sorn and took in the northeastern part of Cumnock and Doon Valley between its borders with Kilmarnock and Loudoun District Council and Clydesdale District Council. Following the Initial Statutory Reviews of Electoral Arrangements in 1981 the ward was abolished and replaced by Catrine, Sorn and North Auchinleck which was an amalgamation of the Catrine and Sorn ward and part of the Auchinleck ward.

Councillors

Election results

1980 election

1977 election

1974 election

References

Wards of East Ayrshire